The Division of Grampians was an 
Australian Electoral Division in Victoria. The division was created in 1900 and was one of the original 75 divisions contested at the first federal election. It was abolished in 1922. It was named for the Grampian Ranges in central Victoria, and included the towns of Daylesford, Maryborough, St Arnaud and Stawell. It was a marginal seat.

Members

Election results

1901 establishments in Australia
Constituencies established in 1901
Grampians